was a Japanese football player. He played for Japan national team.

Club career
Tamura was born on January 10, 1927. He played for Nippon Oil & Fats.

National team career
In March 1951, Tamura was selected Japan national team for Japan team first game after World War II, 1951 Asian Games. At this competition, on March 7, he debuted against Iran. He played 3 games for Japan in 1951.

On October 8, 1986, Tamura died of cancer in Chuo, Tokyo at the age of 59.

National team statistics

Honours
Japan
Asian Games Bronze medal: 1951

References

External links
 
 Japan National Football Team Database

1927 births
1986 deaths
Waseda University alumni
Japanese footballers
Japan international footballers
Asian Games medalists in football
Footballers at the 1951 Asian Games
Medalists at the 1951 Asian Games
Asian Games bronze medalists for Japan
Association football defenders